Styopa Mkrtchyan (born 17 February 2003) is an Armenian professional footballer who plays as a centre back for Ararat-Armenia and the Armenia national football team.

Career

Club
On 1 July 2022, Ararat-Armenia announced the return of Mkrtchyan from a season loan to BKMA Yerevan.

International
In March 2022, Mkrtchyan was called up to the Armenia national football team for the first time.

Career statistics

Club

International

References

External links

2003 births
Living people
Armenian footballers
Association football defenders
FC Ararat-Armenia players
Armenian Premier League players
BKMA Yerevan players
Armenia international footballers